Presidente Bernardes is a municipality in the state of São Paulo in Brazil. The town was named after former president Arthur Bernardes. The population is 13,023 (2020 est.) in an area of 749 km2. The elevation is 429 m.

References

Municipalities in São Paulo (state)